Richard Kavanagh (born 19 March 1949) is an Irish singer-songwriter.

Despite psoriasis crippling his hands, at the age of 44 he went on to become a singer-songwriter who wrote the song "Aon Focal Eile" which gained national attention in 1996. Tony Keogh in South East Radio was the first person to play the song and, after Gerry Ryan began playing it on his RTÉ 2fm national morning show, Kavanagh had a top-ten hit.

Early years
Richie Kavanagh was born and raised in the Raheenwood area of Fenagh, Carlow in Ireland where he still resides. He was encouraged to write songs and sketches by one of his primary school teachers. His other major influence was the travelling road show which would visit his locality when he was a child. Richie loved the performances on the stage and used to go home and stand on the kitchen table and re-enact what he had seen.

Richie started his career in the 1970s as a singer songwriter and started to write his own material. He had a hit song called "Face Her For Mount Leinster", and was establishing himself as a popular entertainer. At that time, his act included his alter ego 'Johnny' as part of his comedy routine.

Musical success
His hit song "Aon Focal Eile" featured in the top ten in the Irish charts for over six months including eight weeks as number one during 1996. He won an IRMA award for Best Single of the Year in Ireland for 1996. The single is currently the 15th-best selling single in Irish chart history. He has also had hits including "The Mobile Phone", "Mickey's Buckin Ass", "Stay Wut Her Johnny", "Chicken Talk", and "A Ride On A Tractor".

His songs have often been a topic of controversy due to his explicit and risque lyrics. Thus, the song "Aon Focal Eile" was banned by BBC radio stations and could only be played on other radio stations in the UK after midnight. The song included widespread use of the Irish word focal which hinted at the English profanity fuck, although it simply translates to word.

Recent years
On 9 February 2011, while being interviewed on the Sue Nunn Programme on KCLR Radio, Kavanagh announced he had been diagnosed with Parkinson's disease. Despite this, he vowed to continue performing.

Discography

Chart singles

References

External links
 

Irish male singer-songwriters
Irish country singers
Musicians from County Carlow
Living people
People educated at St Columb's College
1949 births